Aileen Mercedes Cannon (born 1981) is an American lawyer who serves as a United States district judge of the United States District Court for the Southern District of Florida. Previously, Cannon worked for the corporate law firm Gibson Dunn in 2009 to 2012, and then worked as a federal prosecutor in the Southern District of Florida from 2013 to 2020. She was nominated by President Donald Trump to become a district judge and was confirmed by the U.S. Senate in November 2020.

From August 2022 to December 2022, Cannon presided over the case of Donald J. Trump v. United States of America. Cannon ordered the U.S. government to pause using materials seized from Mar-a-Lago in its investigation while granting former president Trump's request for a special master to review the material. The United States Court of Appeals for the Eleventh Circuit reversed Cannon's order, upon finding that Cannon wrongly exercised jurisdiction over the case, then Cannon dismissed the entire lawsuit per the Eleventh Circuit's instruction.

Early life and education 
Aileen Mercedes Cannon was born in 1981 in Cali, Colombia. Her mother had fled Cuba as a girl, after the Cuban Revolution of the 1950s. Her father is from Indiana, the United States. Cannon has an elder sister. Cannon grew up in Miami, Florida, where she attended Ransom Everglades School, a private school.

Cannon graduated from Duke University in 2003 with a Bachelor of Arts. In college, she studied for a semester in Spain and wrote for Miami's El Nuevo Herald newspaper, her writings included topics of flamenco dancing, festivals, and yoga.. In 2007, Cannon graduated from the University of Michigan Law School with a Juris Doctor, magna cum laude.

Cannon has been a member of the conservative Federalist Society since 2005, when she was a law student. While being considered for the position of a district judge in 2020, Cannon explained that she joined the Federalist Society because of a "diversity of viewpoints" and also because she "found interesting the organization's discussions about the constitutional separation of powers, the rule of law, and the limited role of the judiciary to say what the law is—not to make the law".

Career 
Cannon was admitted to the State Bar of California in 2008 and The Florida Bar in 2012. She has served as a law clerk for Steven Colloton, a conservative judge on the United States Court of Appeals for the Eighth Circuit in Iowa. From 2009 to 2012, she worked for the corporate law firm Gibson, Dunn & Crutcher LLP in Washington D.C., as an associate attorney. In one case in 2011, Cannon defended Stephen "Henry" Brinck Jr., former leader of the fixed income desk of Thomas Weisel Partners, before the Financial Industry Regulatory Authority; Brinck was cleared of fraud in the case.

From 2013 to 2020, Cannon was an assistant United States attorney for the Southern District of Florida. As a federal prosecutor, Cannon worked in the major crimes division, which included working on drug, firearm, and immigration cases, then moved to the appellate division, working on convictions and sentencings. In 2018, Cannon was part of the prosecution that won an appellate case involving Mutual Benefits Corporation's former lawyer Anthony Livoti Jr., reaffirming his 10-year sentence for fraud related to insurance investment. In 2019, Cannon was part of the prosecution that won an appellate case involving Scott W. Rothstein, which allowed prosecutors to withdraw support for reducing his 50-year sentence for a Ponzi scheme. As a prosecutor, Cannon helped secure convictions for 41 defendants, of which four convictions were from jury trials.

Federal judicial service 

In June 2019, the office of Senator Marco Rubio indicated to Cannon that he was considering her for a position of United States district judge. Cannon expressed interest that month, and subsequently was interviewed by representatives for Senator Rubio and Senator Rick Scott, as well as White House and Justice Department legal officials.

On May 21, 2020, at the age of 39, Cannon was nominated by President Donald Trump to serve as a United States district judge of the United States District Court for the Southern District of Florida. She was nominated to the seat left vacant by Judge Kenneth Marra, who assumed senior status on August 1, 2017. The American Bar Association rated Cannon as "Qualified" for the position. The American Bar Association required at least 12 years of law practice as one of their approval criteria, and Cannon just met that standard. While being vetted by the Senate Judiciary Committee, Cannon described her judicial philosophy as originalist and textualist.

Law360 reported that Cannon "avoided scrutiny" during her July 2020 Senate confirmation hearing as the Senators "took it easy" on her; the hearing featured five judicial nominees, with Republican Senators focused on questioning J. Philip Calabrese and Democratic Senators focused on questioning Toby Crouse; later Democratic Senators sent Cannon many follow-up questions to answer.

On November 12, 2020, the United States Senate confirmed Cannon by a 56–21 vote. She received her judicial commission on November 13, 2020.

Notable cases

It was reported in June 2021 that Cannon ordered Swiss cement company LafargeHolcim to reach a settlement to compensate an American family under the Helms-Burton Act for using the family's property in Cuba, which had been seized by the Cuban government in 1960. Before Cannon's order, no one had managed to secure compensation under the Helms-Burton Act for business property confiscated in Cuba.

In the case of Christopher Tavorris Wilkins, a 34-year-old man from Palm Beach Gardens who, in court, threw a chair at and threatened to kill a federal prosecutor, Cannon in April 2022 added 6.5 years of imprisonment to his existing 17.5 year sentence for gun charges.

In the case of Paul Vernon Hoeffer, a 60-year-old man from Palm Beach Gardens who pleaded guilty to making death threats against three Democrats: Speaker of the House Nancy Pelosi, Representative Alexandria Ocasio-Cortez, and prosecutor Kim Foxx, with federal sentencing guidelines recommending 33 and 41 months in prison, and prosecutors proposing 41 months, Cannon in April 2022 sentenced Hoeffer to 18 months in prison and then three years of supervised release, and also fined him $2,000.

In the case of Juan Antonio Garcia, a 31-year-old former Sewall's Point police officer, Cannon in July 2022 sentenced him to 25 years in federal prison, a further 20 years of supervision, and a $10,000 fine for soliciting sex from a teenage boy. Sentencing guidelines imposed a range of between 15 years in prison to a life sentence, while federal prosecutors requested over 30 years imprisonment.

Trump v. United States 

Cannon heard the case of Trump v. United States, which began on August 22, 2022, when former U.S. president Trump asked the court to appoint a special master to review materials seized during the FBI search of Mar-a-Lago earlier that month. On August 27, before hearing argument from the Justice Department, Cannon declared her "preliminary intent" to appoint a special master. Two days later, the Justice Department told Cannon it had already completed its review of materials that may fall under attorney–client privilege.

Cannon on September 5 granted Trump's request for a special master to review the seized materials for attorney-client privilege and executive privilege, and ordered the Justice Department to stop using the seized material in its investigation until the special master's review is complete or until a further court order. In her ruling, Cannon cited exceptional "stigma associated with the subject seizure", since Trump was a former president, as well as the potential for great "reputational harm" from any future indictment based on "property that ought to be returned".

Legal experts, including University of California law professor Orin Kerr, University of Texas School of Law professor Steve Vladeck, and George Mason University professor Mark J. Rozell, voiced surprise with Cannon's ruling or found it problematic. Law360 eventually named this case as one of ten "major legal ethics cases" of 2022, with Cannon having "appeared particularly concerned with Trump's personal interests", and in an "ill-suited" move, she allowed the usage of executive privilege "to shield materials between different parts of the executive branch", leading to "howls from various corners of the legal establishment".

After the Justice Department appealed to Cannon to allow their investigation into seized classified-marked documents to continue, and to exempt such documents from the special master's review, Cannon rejected this on September 15, refusing to accept the government's claims that the documents are classified "without further review by a neutral third party", due to "ongoing factual and legal disputes"; Trump's lawyers had not disputed that the documents were declassified in any court proceeding. Further, Judge Cannon rejected the Justice Department's argument that Trump's possession of the material risked "imminent disclosure of classified information."  She cited "leaks to the media after the underlying seizure" of the documents, without specifying what sources might have been responsible for the leaks.

On September 21, the Eleventh Circuit stayed portions of Cannon's ruling, allowing around 100 classified documents to be used in the Justice Department's investigation, and rescinding the requirement for the special master to review the classified documents. The appeals court stated that under Cannon, "the district court abused its discretion in exercising equitable jurisdiction" over the case, chiefly because of Cannon's own conclusion that Trump "did not show that the United States acted in callous disregard of his constitutional rights"; a critical factor in determining jurisdiction. Furthermore, while Cannon ruled that Trump had an interest in some of the seized documents, the appeals court found that this did not apply to the classified documents, and that under Cannon "the district court made no mention" of why or how Trump "might have an individual interest in or need for the classified documents", which was another factor in determining jurisdiction. The panel stated that there is "no evidence that any of these records were declassified", and that in any case, "the declassification argument is a red herring" that does not establish Trump's "personal interest" in the documents even if they were declassified.

On September 29, Cannon overruled procedures proposed by the special master she appointed, senior federal judge Raymond Dearie, who had been nominated by Trump's legal team; instead Cannon agreed with Trump's legal team on multiple issues, and set procedures including extending the deadline for the review.

On December 1, the Eleventh Circuit ordered the case to be dismissed because Cannon "improperly exercised equitable jurisdiction" over it. The Eleventh Circuit stated that Trump needed to show that the case met all four criteria under the Richey test for equitable jurisdiction over lawsuits for seized materials, but failed to do so for any criteria. The Eleventh Circuit found that under Cannon, "the district court stepped in with its own reasoning" multiple times to argue in favor of Trump, sometimes even taking positions that Trump would not argue before the appeals court. The Eleventh Circuit also found that when Trump did not explain what materials he still needed returned, or why, the "district court was undeterred by this lack of information".

The National Law Journal wrote that the Eleventh Circuit's decision "reads as a rebuke of" Cannon, with New York University law professor Peter M. Shane commenting: "If an appellate court tells a lower court that we can only accept your judgment by betraying one of the nation’s founding principles, that's a pretty strong rebuke." Duke University School of Law professor Samuel W. Buell opined on the case affecting Cannon's judicial legacy, stating that it "might end up being the most high-profile case she has in her career, so it’s not going away", but "this opinion has her having been very wrong".

On December 8, the Eleventh Circuit ended the special master's review and permitted the government to use non-classified seized material in its investigation. On December 12, Cannon had Trump's case "dismissed for lack of jurisdiction", after the Eleventh Circuit instructed her to dismiss.

Cannon was the subject of ethics complaints over her handling of this case, but the complaints were dismissed in December 2022 by the Eleventh Circuit's chief judge, William Pryor. 

Cannon allegedly received threats in September 2022; a woman from Houston was charged for allegedly leaving Cannon voicemails that stated that the caller was "Donald Trump's hitman, so consider it a bullet from Donald Trump himself", and also stated: "You’re helping him, ma’am ... He’s marked for assassination and so are you"; the criminal complaint against the Houston woman stated that she appears to "suffer from severe mental impairments with symptoms including paranoia and delusions".

Personal life

Cannon married Josh Lorence, a restaurant executive, in 2008. They have two children and live in Vero Beach, Florida as of 2022. Cannon is a registered Republican. She donated $100 to Ron DeSantis' gubernatorial campaign in 2018.

References

External links 
 

1981 births
Living people
21st-century American women lawyers
21st-century American lawyers
21st-century American judges
21st-century American women judges
Assistant United States Attorneys
Duke University alumni
Federalist Society members
Florida lawyers
Hispanic and Latino American judges
Judges of the United States District Court for the Southern District of Florida
People associated with Gibson Dunn
People from Valle del Cauca Department
United States district court judges appointed by Donald Trump
University of Michigan Law School alumni
People from Vero Beach, Florida
Florida Republicans